2002–03 Belarusian Cup was the twelfth season of the Belarusian annual football cup competition. Contrary to the league season, it is conducted in a fall-spring rhythm. The first games were played on 7 August 2002. Winners of the Cup qualified for the UEFA Cup Qualifying Round.

First round
17 teams joined competition in this round. Six clubs from Second League were drawn against six clubs from First League. Another five First League teams (Darida Minsk Raion, Naftan Novopolotsk, Kommunalnik Slonim, Torpedo-Kadino Mogilev, Khimik Svetlogorsk) advanced to the next round by drawing of lots. The rest of First and Second League teams did not participate in this edition of the Cup. All games were played on 7 August 2002.

Round of 32
15 winners of previous round were joined by 14 clubs from Premier League. Seven clubs advanced to the next round by drawing of lots (Dinamo Minsk, Dnepr-Transmash Mogilev, Gomel, Molodechno-2000, Torpedo-MAZ Minsk, Lokomotiv Minsk (II), Vertikal Kalinkovichi (III)). The games were played on 18 August 2002.

Round of 16
The games were played on 15 September 2002.

Quarterfinals
The games were played on 22 April 2003.

Semifinals
The first legs were played on 8 May 2003. The second legs were played on 16 May 2003.

|}

First leg

Second leg

Final

External links
RSSSF

Belarusian Cup seasons
Belarusian Cup
Cup
Cup